Rosita Fornés (née Rosalía Lourdes Elisa Palet Bonavia; February 11, 1923June 10, 2020) was a Cuban-American singer and film actress. She was noted for her multifaceted career in the entertainment industry of Cuba. She worked in cinema, the theater, radio, television and cabaret.

Early life
Fornés was born on February 11, 1923, in New York City and moved to Cuba as a child. Her parents were immigrants from Spain. Her father was Catalan and her mother was from Madrid. They eventually divorced and her mother remarried when Fornés was approximately five. She took her stepfather's name. When she was ten, the family moved to Spain, where they lived for three years before returning to Cuba.

Career
Fornés made her stage debut in 1938, when she featured in the musical comedy La corte suprema del arte. She subsequently appeared in two Cuban films before moving to Mexico, where she starred in several films during the Golden Age of Mexican cinema. These included The Desire, Del can-can al mambo, Cara sucia, and Se acabaron las mujeres.

She returned to Cuba in 1952, and appeared on Cuban television. 

Fornés was lauded for being one of the pioneers of Cuban television. Her versatility meant that she was able to perform in various areas of the Cuban entertainment industry. These included cinema, the theater, radio, television and cabaret. She gave her final performance in 2019, one year before her death. It took place at a tribute concert for Meme Solis held at the Miami-Dade County Auditorium.

Personal life
Fornés' first marriage was to Manuel Medel. They resided in Mexico and had one daughter together, Rosa María. She moved back to Havana in 1952 after they divorced. She subsequently married Armando Bianchi. They moved to Spain, where they worked for the Barcelona Comic Theater, the Madrid Theater and the Alcázar Theater from 1957 until 1959, before he died in 1981.

Fornés died on June 10, 2020, at a hospital in the Miami metropolitan area. She was 97, and had suffered complications from emphysema.

Selected filmography
Source: 
 A Dangerous Adventure (1939)
 Musical Romance (1941)
 The Flesh Commands (1948)
 The Desire (1948)
 Del can-can al mambo (1951)
 Women of the Theatre (1951)
 The Unknown Mariachi (1953)
 Me Gustan Todas / Hotel Tropical''' (1954) Dir: Juan J. Ortega. País: México-Cuba
 No me olvides nunca (1955) Dir: Juan J. Ortega. Country: México-Cuba
 Palmer ha muerto (1960) Dir: Juan Fortuny. Country: Puerto Rico-España
 Se permuta (1984) Dir: Juan Carlos Tabío. País: Cuba
 Plácido (1986) Dir: Sergio Giral. País: Cuba
 Hoy como ayer / El bárbaro del ritmo (1987) Dir: Constante "Rapi" Diego / Sergio Véjar. Country: Cuba-México
 Papeles Secundarios (1989) Dir: Orlando Rojas. Country: Cuba-España
 Quiéreme y verás (1994) Dir: Daniel Díaz Torres. Country: Cuba
 Las noches de Constantinopla (2001) Dir: Orlando Rojas. Country: Cuba-España
 Al atardecer (2001) Dir: Tomás Piard. Country: Cuba
 Tin Tan, un documental de Francesco Taboada Tabone. (2010) Country: México
 Mejilla con mejilla'' (2011) Dir: Delso Aquino. Country: Cuba

References

External links 

 

1923 births
2020 deaths
Cuban film actresses
20th-century Cuban women singers
Cuban people of Spanish descent
Cuban people of Catalan descent
Cuban emigrants to the United States
Mexican vedettes
Singers from New York City
Cuban expatriates in Spain
21st-century Cuban women singers